The Poseokjeong (Pavilion of Stone Abalone) site near Namsan in Gyeongju, Gyeongsangbuk-do South Korea, was built in the Unified Silla period. The site once featured a royal pavilion — said to have been the most beautiful royal villa of the time — but the only remains today is a granite water feature. This abalone-shaped watercourse highlights the importance of water in traditional Korean gardens. The "Poseokjeong" consists of several hand-carved stone pieces. These pieces create very geometric shape and it sloped slightly for the smooth water flow. At that time, people gathered around the Poseokjeong. They floated their cups (for alcohol) and when the cup stops at a person, he should drink and recite a poem.

During banquets in the last days of the Unified Silla kingdom, the king's official and noble guests would engage in winding stream parties, sitting along the watercourse, chatting and reciting poetry, engaged in drinking games. One of the guests would start by enunciating a line of poetry, challenge one of the other guests to compose an appropriate second line while floating of cup wine in the water. Due to the variety of curves in the channel, the speed the wine cups transversed the course was influenced by the shape of the cup, rate of the water flow and the level of the wine in the cup. Should the cup of wine reach the guest before he could submit a suitable subsequent line he must consume that entire cup of wine and try again, and again, until the task was accomplished.

The site has an area of 7,432 m²/4.6 mi². There are no records of when Poseokjeong was built, but the stone channel is known to have been created in the time of Unified Silla. It was designated as historic site No.1 in 1963. Poseokjeong is named after the abalone-shaped water feature. The feature itself is about 10.3 m/11.2 yd in length and 5 m/5.4 yd in width, and consists of 63 blocks of granite. These blocks are on average 26 cm/10.2 in deep and 35 cm/13.8 in wide. Zelkova, pine and bamboo trees preserve a calm atmosphere at Poseokjeong today, but the garden was tended differently at the time. Some of the trees are several hundred years old.

When still in use, the watercourse is thought to have used water from the nearby stream in the Namsan valley. The water of the Namsan valley was appreciated by the Silla people for its purity and cleanliness. A stone turtle once spewed the water, but this feature does not remain today.

A legend is linked with Poseokjeong. According to this legend, the spirit of Namsan attended a party of king Heong-gang Wang.

King Gyeong-ae Wang (924-927) was killed at Poseokjeong, while indulging in his pleasures here, by Gyeonhwon of later Baekje. For that reason Poseokjeong stands symbolically for the demise of the Silla kingdom.

Gallery

References

See also
 Tourism in Gyeongju
 Culture of Korea
 Korean architecture
 Cyber Tour Into Cultural Property - Poseokjeong Pavilion Site

Archaeological sites in South Korea
Silla
Buildings and structures in Gyeongju
Historic Sites of South Korea